Boa Vista do Buricá is a municipality in the state of Rio Grande do Sul, Brazil, located at , at an altitude of 291 meters above sea level. It has an area of 108,732 kilometers². The population was estimated at 6,712 in 2020. It has a predominantly agricultural economy, but there is also an industrial park for small and medium enterprises in different sectors. Its population consists mainly of the descendants European of immigrants, the vast majority of Germanic origin. German is frequently used.

See also
List of municipalities in Rio Grande do Sul

References

Municipalities in Rio Grande do Sul